In cattle, Angus may refer to:

 Aberdeen Angus, a breed of beef cattle in Scotland and the United Kingdom
 American Angus
 German Angus
 Red Angus

See also 
 Australian Lowline